Tavener is an unincorporated community in Fort Bend County, Texas, United States. Tavener no longer has its own post office, schools and railroad stop, as it once did. There is no road sign identifying the community though the Tavener Gin is prominently labeled on the north side of the Union Pacific railway line, which parallels US 90A. A small bar and grill and a number of homes can be found in the area.

Geography
Tavener is located in Fort Bend County, Texas on US 90A between East Bernard and Rosenberg. FM 1952, also known as Tavener Road, starts at US 90A and goes directly north from the Tavener area. The road branches  to the north and FM 1952 turns west toward Wallis, while FM 1489 continues north to Orchard. FM 1875 goes southeast from its intersection with US 90A to Beasley.

There is no Tavener road sign on US 90A. However, on the north side of the Union Pacific railway, a cotton gin at the intersection of FM 1952 is labeled TAVENER GIN in large black letters. Most of the land in the area is devoted to agricultural use. The level land surface is almost featureless except for a small creek that flows from the northwest and crosses under US 90A near Herman Sulak Road. The stream continues in a southerly direction and empties into the San Bernard River south of Kendleton.

North of US 90A the road net and property lines conform to a square pattern oriented north-to-south. Between US 90A and Koym Road, property lines are parallel with US 90A and with the north-south roads. South of Koym Road the road net and property lines conform to the northwest-to-southeast square pattern typical of the Needville area. The local roads bear English (Hopkins, Brandon, West Tavener), German (Behrens, Engel) and Czech (Sulak, Pilcik, Marek) names.

History
In 1890, the Texas and New Orleans Railroad added a stop and named it Tavener after Charlie Tavener, an early resident. The community received a post office in 1910. Four years later, the 25-person settlement boasted a lumberyard, general store, and telephone service. By 1926, Tavener had one school attended by 135 white children and a second segregated school with 28 black children. Postal service ceased in the 1930s. The community had a population of 50 and four commercial establishments in 1933. Only one business remained in 1945, but the number of residents remained steady. By 1953 only 20 people were recorded as living in the settlement. In 1970, the population was 30 persons.

Education
Brazos Independent School District operates schools in the area.

Gallery

References

Unincorporated communities in Fort Bend County, Texas
Unincorporated communities in Texas